Edwin Jackson may refer to:

Edwin Jackson (American football) (1991–2018), American football player
Edwin Jackson (baseball) (born 1983), American baseball player
Edwin Jackson (basketball) (born 1989), French basketball player

See also
Eddie Jackson (disambiguation)
Edward Jackson (disambiguation)
Edwin Jackson Kyle